The 2019 Dissolution Honours List was issued on 31 July 2020 following the 2019 United Kingdom general election the previous December, in which the Conservative Party won a large majority. 
This list was released concurrently with the 2020 Political Honours list.

Life Peerages 
Conservative

 Sir Henry Bellingham, to be Baron Bellingham, of Congham in the County of Norfolk
 Rt. Hon. Kenneth Clarke, to be Baron Clarke of Nottingham, of West Bridgford in the County of Nottinghamshire
 Rt. Hon. Ruth Davidson, to be Baroness Davidson of Lundin Links, of Lundin Links in the County of Fife 
 Rt. Hon. Philip Hammond, to be Baron Hammond of Runnymede, of Runnymede in the County of Surrey
 Rt. Hon. Nicholas Herbert, to be Baron Herbert of South Downs, of Arundel in the County of West Sussex
 Rt. Hon. Joseph Johnson, to be Baron Johnson of Marylebone, of Marylebone in the City of Westminster
 Colonel Rt. Hon. John Mark Lancaster, to be Baron Lancaster of Kimbolton, of Kimbolton in the County of Cambridgeshire
 Rt. Hon. Sir Patrick McLoughlin, to be Baron McLoughlin, of Cannock Chase in the County of Staffordshire
 Aamer Sarfraz, to be Baron Sarfaz, of Kensington in the Royal London Borough of Kensington and Chelsea
 Rt. Hon. Edward Vaizey, to be Baron Vaizey of Didcot, of Wantage in the County of Oxfordshire

Labour

 Kathryn Clark, to be Baroness Clark of Kilwinning, of Kilwinning in the County of Ayrshire
 Brinley Davies, to be Baron Davies of Brixton, of Brixton in the London Borough of Lambeth

Democratic Unionist Party

 Rt. Hon. Nigel Dodds, to be Baron Dodds of Duncairn, of Duncairn in the City of Belfast
Non-affiliated

 Rt. Hon. Frank Field, to be Baron Field of Birkenhead, of Birkenhead in the County of Merseyside
Catherine Hoey, to be Baroness Hoey, of Lylehill and Rathlin in the County of Antrim
Ian Austin, to be Baron Austin of Dudley, of Dudley in the County of West Midlands
 Rt. Hon. Gisela Stuart, to be Baroness Stuart of Edgbaston, of Edgbaston in the City of Birmingham
John Woodcock, to be Baron Walney, of the Isle of Walney in the County of Cumbria

Knights Bachelor 

 Philip May – for political service
 Raymond Puddifoot – for services to the London Borough of Hillingdon

References

External links 

 Downing Street announcement of the list

Dissolution Honours
Dissolution Honours 2019
Boris Johnson
2019 awards in the United Kingdom